Mohamed M'Bareck Gaucher (born 13 May 1995) is a  Mauritanian footballer plays as a winger for Al-Suqoor and the Mauritania national team.

References

External links
 

1995 births
Living people
Mauritanian footballers
Mauritanian expatriate footballers
Mauritania international footballers
Stade Tunisien players
Jeddah Club players
Al-Taqadom FC players
Al-Suqoor FC players
Association football wingers
Tunisian Ligue Professionnelle 1 players
Saudi First Division League players
Saudi Second Division players
Expatriate footballers in Tunisia
Mauritanian expatriate sportspeople in Tunisia
Expatriate footballers in Saudi Arabia
Mauritanian expatriate sportspeople in Saudi Arabia